Taeme (or Tame) is a Pahoturi language spoken in Kondobol ward, northeast Morehead Rural LLG, Western Province, Papua New Guinea. It is spoken by 834 people in Taeme village, Kondobol ward, Morehead Rural LLG.

Taeme is most closely related to Idi.

References

Pahoturi languages
Languages of Western Province (Papua New Guinea)